Hermann Garrn (11 March 1888 – 27 March 1966), also sometimes known as Hermann Ehlers, was a German international footballer who played for SC Victoria Hamburg.

References

1888 births
1966 deaths
German footballers
Association football forwards
Germany international footballers
SC Victoria Hamburg players
Place of birth missing
Place of death missing